The Eichstätt witch trials was a series of witch trials that took place in the Prince-Bishopric of Eichstätt (German: Hochstift Eichstätt, Fürtsbistum Eichstätt), Bavaria, Germany, between 1532 and 1723. They resulted in the execution of at least 224 people (197 women and 27 men), and were among the biggest witch trials in Germany. The trials were mainly conducted under the approval of Prince Bishop Johann Christoph von Westerstetten between 1613 and 1630. The last known execution in Eichstätt was conducted in 1723.

Persecution phases

Early phase before 1562 
The first known executions for witchcraft in Eichstätt were carried out in 1532 when two women were sentenced to death. The same happened to another woman in 1535. Margreth Auerhamerin was expelled from the bishopric in 1551 as she did not confess any witchcraft which she was accused of.

First phase 1562–1590 
The first larger persecution happened under the authority of Prince-Bishop Martin von Schaumberg (1560–1590) and affected only women in the upper exclaves ("Oberes Stift") of the prince-bishopric mainly in 1590. At least 24 women were imprisoned and 23 executed, one released.

Second phase 1603–1612 
During the governance of Prince-Bishop Johann Konrad von Gemmingen (1595–1612) at least 20 women of the lower exclaves ("Unteres Stift") were put to death for witchcraft, most of them 1603.

Third phase 1613–1630 
The by far largest persecution phase of so-called witches in the Prince-Bishopric of Eichstätt began 1613 when Johann Christoph von Westerstetten became Prince-Bishop there. In 1611 and 1612 about 260 witches were already been executed under his authority in Ellwangen where he had been provost since 1603. As in Ellwangen the persecutions in Eichstätt were driven systematically and affected more and more the center of the bishopric and also men. 80% of all victims fell in his governance. After the execution of one woman in 1613 between 3 and 25 executions were carried out each year from 1616 to 1630. Altogether at least 199 people were accused and 176 (150 women and 26 men) of them executed for witchcraft in the Prince-Bishopric of Eichstätt in these 18 years.

The massive pursuance ended suddenly in July 1630 when the Holy Roman Emperor Ferdinand and Prince-elector of Bavaria Maximilian prohibited the witch-hunt in the Franconian Circle at the Diet of Regensburg (1630). Westerstetten left Eichstätt 1631 and went to Ingolstadt where he died in 1637.

Last executions after 1700 
About 75 years later a 15-year-old boy called Balthasar Gorck was sentenced to death for witchcraft in 1705. The last known execution in Eichstätt affected Walburga Rung, a pauperized girl at the age of 22, on November 22, 1723.

Comparison with other towns 
Due to the large number of victims compared to the small number of inhabitants Eichstätt belongs to the center of persecution of witchcraft in the Holy Roman Empire after Würzburg, Bamberg and Fulda. This is even more astonishing as the neighbour town Ingolstadt with its faculty of law only had 11 executions of witches. Obviously the opponents of witch persecution could establish themselves in Ingolstadt while the supporters did in Eichstätt.

The victims 
Up to now there is evidence for 249 people to be accused and imprisoned for witchcraft in the Prince-Bishopric of Eichstätt between 1532 and 1723. The real number might be higher presumably 10% more. 224 (90%) were verifiably executed. 219 (88%) of the victims were women and 30 (12%) men.
In the beginning of the persecution only women of the rural communities were affected. In the course of time the pursuance moved to the center and the town of Eichstätt and affected more and more higher social classes. Among the victims were six councilmen (Ratsherren), ten mayor (Bürgermeister) and five steward (Kastner) respectively their wives and many women whose husbands worked as craftsman for the Bishop. The age of the victims when they were arrested was recorded only for 87 persons and was often not exactly given. The range lasted from 12 to 77 years with a mean value of 49. Half of the people were younger than 50 years old.

A list of all victims can be found here.

Sources

Josef Auer and Heinrich Stürzl, "Hinrichtungen wegen Hexerei in Eichstätt von 1585-1723", Blätter des Bayerischen Landesvereins für Familienkunde 76 (2013): 225–283. ISSN 0005-7118
Stürzl Heinrich: Zur Hexenverfolgung im Oberen Stift des Hochstifts Eichstätt. Nachtrag zu: Hinrichtungen wegen Hexerei in Eichstätt. In: Blätter des Bayerischen Landesvereins für Familienkunde. Selbstverlag, München. 2016:79:123–140.

External links 

Witch trials in Germany
1617 in law
1618 in law
1619 in law
1620 in law
1621 in the Holy Roman Empire
1623 in the Holy Roman Empire
Eichstätt
1617 in the Holy Roman Empire
1622 in the Holy Roman Empire
1627 in the Holy Roman Empire
1630 in the Holy Roman Empire